Springbox may refer to:

 Springbox (company), an interactive services agency.
 Spring box, a structure engineered to make optimum use of a natural spring.

See also 
 Springbok (disambiguation)